Black Thorn, White Rose is the second book in a series of collections of re-told fairy tales edited by Ellen Datlow and Terri Windling.

Contents
Introduction by Ellen Datlow & Terri Windling
Words Like Pale Stones by Nancy Kress—a retelling of Rumplestiltskin in which the miller's daughter proves herself to be resourceful and resolute.
Stronger Than Time by Patricia C. Wrede
Somnus’s Fair Maid by Ann Downer
The Frog King, or Iron Henry by Daniel Quinn
Near-Beauty by M. E. Beckett
Ogre by Michael Kandel
Can’t Catch Me by Michael Cadnum
Journeybread Recipe by Lawrence Schimel
The Brown Bear of Norway by Isabel Cole
The Goose Girl by Tim Wynne-Jones
Tattercoats by Midori Snyder
Granny Rumple by Jane Yolen
The Sawing Boys by Howard Waldrop
Godson by Roger Zelazny
Ashputtle by Peter Straub
Silver and Gold by Ellen Steiber
Sweet Bruising Skin by Storm Constantine
The Black Swan by Susan Wade
Recommended Reading—Misc. Material

References

External links
Ellen Datlow's Bibliography

1994 anthologies
Fantasy anthologies
Horror anthologies
Collections of fairy tales
William Morrow and Company books